This  list of heritage buildings on Hiddensee lists all the historic monuments on the German Baltic Sea island of Hiddensee (county of Vorpommern-Rügen) by parish.

Grieben 

 Dorfstraße 50; fisherman's house

Kloster 
 Am Klostertor; abbey gate
 Am Klostertor 6; home, first home of Gerhart Hauptmann
 Biologenweg 3; home
 Biologenweg 5; home (doctoral students' house) and seminary building
 Biologenweg 20; home
 Hügelweg 19; home (Haus Felsenstein, entire site), and guest house and garden
 Kirchweg 1; Museum (former lifeboat station)
 Kirchweg 13; cemetery with graves of Gerhard Hauptmann und grave steles near the church
 Kirchweg 13; Seedorn Villa and extensions (Gerhard Hauptmann Museum)
 Kirchweg 35; church
 Lighthouseweg; Dornbusch Lighthouse
 Zum Hochland; Lietzenburg
 Zum Hochland 17; former pension (today a bird house)

Neuendorf 
 Königsbarg 10; Groot Partie fisherman's shed
 Pluderbarg 7; Lütt Partie fisherman's shed
 Schabernack 13; home
 Schabernack 15; home
 Schabernack 17; home

Vitte 
 In den Dünen 127; inn
 Norderende 90; home
 Norderende 92/94; home and garden
 Norderende 140; home
 Norderende 172; windmill
 Sprenge 30; home
 Süderende 35: cottage
 Süderende 57; home (doctor's house) and stable
 Süderende 73; home
 Süderende 105: fisherman’s cottage (Hexenhaus = "witch’s house")
 Zum Segelhafen 7; home Asta Nielsen
 Zum Segelhafen 13; home, Nordperd
 Lighthouse on the Gellen

References 
 Heritage list for Landkreis Rügen

Hiddensee
Heritage buildings